The Fox News Channel's documentary unit was headed by David Asman from August 2005 until he joined the Fox Business Channel in September 2007. The Executive Producer of the unit is Brian Gaffney. In March 2008, Fox began posting selected specials on the video clip internet site, Hulu.com. A list of the specials broadcast by Fox News includes:

{| class="wikitable"
!Originally aired on
!Title
!Host
|-
| April 5, 2004
| Who Is Jesus?
| Jon Scott
|-
| September 13, 2004
| U.N. Blood Money
| David Asman
|-
| October 17, 2004
| U.N. Blood Money: New Revelations
| David Asman
|-
| December 5, 2004
| Battle of Fallujah: Heroes of India Company
| Greg Palkot
|-
| December 19, 2004
| The Birth of Jesus
| Jon Scott
|-
| February 13, 2005
| U.N. Blood Money: Kofi Annan Under Fire
| David Asman
|-
| April 24, 2005
| Iran: The Nuclear Threat
| Chris Wallace
|-
| May 29, 2005
| In the Field with Steve Harrigan
| Steve Harrigan
|-
| June 25, 2005
| American Gangs: Ties to Terror?
| Newt Gingrich
|-
| July 9, 2005
| Discovery: Return to Space
| Jon Scott
|-
| August 13, 2005
| Company of Heroes
| Jon Scott
|-
| August 20, 2005
| The Pizza Bomber Mystery
| Geraldo Rivera
|-
| October 15, 2005
| Saddam Hussein on Trial
| Dan Senor
|-
| November 13, 2005
| The Heat Is On: The Case of Global Warming
| Rick Folbaum
|-
| November 26–27, 2005
| Thomas Sowell: In the Right Direction
| Fred Barnes
|-
| December 3, 2005
| Winning Iraq: The Untold Story
| David Asman
|-
| December 18, 2005
| Religion in America: Church and State
| Brit Hume
|-
| December 24, 2005
| A Special for Young People
| Uma Pemmaraju
|-
| December 25, 2005
| Can We Live Without God?
| Lauren Green
|-
| December 25, 2005
| Rewind 2005: What a Year!
| David Asman
|-
| December 31, 2005
| All-American New Year's 2006
| Mike Jerrick and Juliet Huddy
|-
| February 19, 2006
| The Bird Flu: Fact and Fiction
| Newt Gingrich
|-
| March 11, 2006
| Iran and the Bomb
| David Asman
|-
| April 22, 2006
| Crime Scene: Murder in the Heartland
| Greta Van Susteren
|-
| April 23, 2006
| Lion in the Desert
| David Asman
|-
| April 30, 2006
| Fox News Sunday at 10
| Chris Wallace
|-
| May 7, 2006
| Why He Fights
| Bret Baier
|-
| May 21, 2006
| Global Warming: The Debate Continues
| David Asman
|-
| May 26, 2006
| Crime Scene: Missing in Paradise
| Greta Van Susteren
|-
| June 3, 2006
| The Battle for Arab Democracy
| Brit Hume and Dennis Ross
|-
| July 2, 2006
| A Special for Young People (II)
| Uma Pemmaraju
|-
| August 20, 2006
| Purpose-Driven Life: Can Rick Warren Change the World?
| David Asman
|-
| August 27, 2006
| Why Does College Cost So Much...And Is It Worth It?
| Newt Gingrich
|-
| September 16, 2006
| Crime Scene: Dark Waters
| Greta Van Susteren
|-
| October 7, 2006
| Crime Scene: The Amish Schoolhouse Murders
| Greta Van Susteren
|-
| October 8, 2006
| Fox News Channel at Ten: Thank You, America
| Martha MacCallum and Chris Wallace
|-
| October 14, 2006
| North Korea: A Threat to the World
| Shepard Smith
|-
| October 29, 2006
| Hannity on America
| Sean Hannity
|-
| November 4, 2006
| Obsession: The Threat of Radical Islam
| E.D. Hill
|-
| November 11, 2006
| Crime Scene: Gambling on Love
| Greta Van Susteren
|-
| November 18, 2006
| Planet Mancow
| Mancow Muller
|-
| December 16, 2006
| One Nation Under God: Religion and History in Washington D.C.
| Newt Gingrich
|-
| December 24, 2006
| The Meaning of Christmas
| Rick Warren
|-
| December 31, 2006
| A Nashville New Year
| Sean Hannity
|-
| December 31, 2006
| All-American New Year 2007
| Bill Hemmer and Julie Banderas
|-
| January 6, 2007
| The Best of 'Geraldo at Large'''
| Julie Banderas
|-
| January 20, 2007
| Smokescreen: Hezbollah in America| David Asman
|-
| February 3, 2007
| Radical Islam: Terror in Its Own Words| E.D. Hill
|-
| February 10, 2007
| Anna Nicole: Tragic Beauty| Geraldo Rivera
|-
| February 24, 2007
| Reel Politics: If Hollywood Ran America| Bill McCuddy
|-
| March 24, 2007
| Britney Spears: Toxic Exposure| Bill McCuddy
|-
| March 31, 2007
| Socks, Scissors, Paper: The Sandy Berger Caper| David Asman
|-
| April 8, 2007
| The Passion: Fact, Faith & Fiction| Lauren Green
|-
| April 22, 2007
| Crime Scene: The Virginia Tech Massacre| Greta Van Susteren
|-
| May 13, 2007
| V for Valor: American Heroes in Iraq| Trace Gallagher
|-
| June 24, 2007
| Banned By PBS: Muslims Against Jihad| E.D. Hill
|-
| June 24, 2007
| Secrets of Success| Uma Pemmaraju
|-
| July 6, 2007
| After Diana: The Future of the Kingdom| Martha MacCallum
|-
| July 14, 2007
| Final Delivery: The Pizza Bomber Mystery| Geraldo Rivera
|-
| August 11, 2007
| Victory or Retreat: The Surge and Politics| David Asman
|-
| September 29, 2007
| Iran: The Ticking Bomb| Dan Senor
|-
| October 13, 2007
| Dick Cheney: No Retreat| Bret Baier
|-
| October 20, 2007
| Inside Islam: Faith vs. Fanatics| E.D. Hill
|-
| October 27, 2007
| Facing Reality: Choice| E.D. Hill
|-
| January 27, 2008
| George W. Bush: Fighting to the Finish| Bret Baier
|-
| March 1, 2008
| William F. Buckley: Right from the Start| David Asman
|-
| March 29, 2008
| Jihad, USA: Homegrown Terror| E.D. Hill
|-
|}Each special links to its page on FoxNews.com References 

External links
 Fox News Specials on FoxNews.com
 "The Winning Side," National Review Online, 2005
 "A Grim Reality" New York Post, 2007
 "Deciding Whether to Bring a Pregnancy to Term" The New York Times, 2007
 "A Sobering Look at Abortion" Miami Herald'', 2007
 "Mission unaccomplished" Salon.com January 24, 2008

Fox News
Fox News Specials